The Prison - A Book with a Soundtrack (or simply The Prison) is Michael Nesmith's seventh solo album of his post-Monkees career and his first to be released under his own record label, Pacific Arts. It includes a novella meant to be read while listening to the album as its "soundtrack". Nesmith recorded a companion novella/album entitled The Garden, released in 1994.  According to Nesmith's website (Videoranch), a third installment titled The Ocean has been released and completes the Infinitia trilogy

The Prison and The Garden were re-released together on CD in 2004 by Video Ranch.

Critical reception
Allmusic called The Prison "a brilliant multimedia concept marrying the personal and inner visual experience of Michael "Papa Nez" Nesmith's novella with the aural medium of an equally original soundtrack." Robert Christgau called it a "ghastly boxed audio-allegory-with-book."

Remixes
"The Prison" was dramatically remixed by Michael Nesmith for CD release on "Rio Records" in 1990, and again in 2007 on "Edsel Records". Some changes on both remixes include the removal or addition of drum machines, extra reverb on vocals (in the case of the 2007 remix, a new or alternate lead vocal track in places), and many other changes. 

Although the iTunes download of "The Prison" is credited in the iTunes store as the 1990 remix, it is actually the 2007 remix. As of September 2013, the original mix that appeared on vinyl has not been officially released on CD. However, according to Videoranch.com, on "Wednesday, August 16, 2017, Nez opened up a sealed box set [of "The Prison"] from 1974" and proceeded to digitally transfer sides one and two, taking it "off the record completely flat - straight wire. All that can be heard is what he created four decades ago." This digital transfer is currently available to download from Videoranch.com - as individual MP3 files ($1.99 each) or as one long continuous MP3 file ($9.99) at 320kbps.

Track listing
All songs by Michael Nesmith.
 "Opening Theme (Life, the Unsuspecting Captive)" – 3:31
 "Dance Between the Raindrops" – 6:47
 "Elusive Ragings" – 5:11
 "Waking Mystery" – 7:36
 "Hear Me Calling?" – 4:51
 "Marie's Theme" – 11:51
 "Closing Theme (Lampost)"  – 9:23

Personnel 
 Michael Nesmith - vocals and guitars
 David Kempton - Arp Odyssey
 Red Rhodes - pedal steel guitar
 Michael Cohen - keyboard
 Chura - congas
 Roland Rhythm 77 - drums

References

Michael Nesmith albums
Concept albums
Book soundtracks
1974 soundtrack albums